Ibinabo Jack is an English actress, known for her role as Theresa Sutton on the BBC soap opera Doctors (2019) and as DC Jacqueline Williams on the ITV crime drama television series Vera (2018–present).

Filmography

Stage

References

External links
 
 

Alumni of the Mountview Academy of Theatre Arts
Black British actresses
English musical theatre actresses
English stage actresses
English television actresses
Living people
People from Wigan
Year of birth missing (living people)